Qinyang is a county-level city in Henan province, China, bordering Shanxi province to the north. It is administered by the prefecture-level city Jiaozuo. The current population of Qinyang is estimated at 470,000. In 1999, the population stood at 444,480.

History
Qinyang was known as Yewang during the Qin Dynasty, changed to Henei county during the Sui, and served as the capital seat of Huaizhou during the Tang, Hwai-king (Hwaiking) Foo under the Qing, and received the current name in 1913.

Geography
Location

Located between 112'46'~113°02' east longitude and 34°59'~35°18' north latitude, Qinyang which lies in the northwest of Henan Province occupies a total area of 623.5 square kilometers. It was beside the Yellow River in the late 19th century, but the river's floods have since moved it further south. Qinyang is now located along the Zhan (Zhànhé), a tributary of the Yellow River. A part of the Taihang Mountains called the Shennong Mountain is in the rural area of Qinyang City.The southeast of Qinyang City is 128 kilometers away from Zhengzhou, the provincial capital, 90 kilometers away from Luoyang in the east and 36 kilometers away from Jiaozuo in the east.

Terrain
here are many plains in the territory, and the rest are mountainous and hilly areas. The north is Taihang Mountain, the south is overlooking the Yellow River, and the mountains and plains coexist. The terrain is generally high in the northwest and low in the southeast. From north to south, there are three types of mountains, hills and plains. The famous mountain peaks include Zijin Mountain (commonly known as Xiaobeiding), Yuntai Mountain, Yunyang Mountain and Yangshan, all of which belong to the tail of the Taihang Mountains. Among them, Zijin Mountain and Yuntai Mountain are above 1,100 meters above sea level.

Climate

Qinyang City is a warm temperate continental climate with four distinct seasons, dry and windy springs, hot and rainy summers, warm and cool nights in autumn, and cold and dry in winter. The seasonal temperature changes obviously. Three months, the intensity of precipitation is large, often causing floods. The average annual frost-free period is 210 days.

Administrative divisions
As 2012, this county is divided to 4 subdistricts, 6 towns and 3 townships.
Subdistricts

Towns

Townships
Changping Township
Wangqu Township
Wangzhao Township

Notable individuals 

Li Shangyin, one of the most outstanding poets of the late Tang Dynasty, is from Huaizhou Hanoi (now Henan Qinyang).

Zhu Zaiyu, a famous musician, born in the Ming Dynasty Wang Gong (now Henan Qinyang), is Ming Taizu Zhu Yuanzhang's eighth generation.

Song Xueyi, a native of Beikong Village, Fuyang City, Henan Province, is one of the "Langya Mountain Five Hero Squad".

References

External links
 Government website 

Cities in Henan
County-level divisions of Henan
Jiaozuo